Najah ( najāḥ) is an Arabic surname, female and male given name meaning "simplicity, relief, ease, clearness" or "victory, triumph, successful". The name actually is used as a noun. 

Notable people with this name include:

Given name
 Najah Al-Masaeed (born 1977), Emirati poet and media figure
 Najah Ali (born 1980), Iraqi boxer
 Najah Chouaya (born 1988), Tunisian athlete
 Najah Wakim (born 1946), Lebanese politician
 Najah al-Attar (born 1933), Syrian politician
 Najah al-Shammari (born 1967), Iraqi politician

Surname name
 Abderrahim Najah (born 1984), Moroccan basketball player
 Ahmed Najah (born 1947), Moroccan football player
 Anass Najah (born 1997), Moroccan football player
 Imad Najah (born 1991), Moroccan football player

Arabic-language surnames
Arabic given names